Andrew McCreadie (born 19 November 1870 in Girvan) was a Scottish professional footballer, who played for Rangers, Sunderland and appeared in two international matches for Scotland.

He played as a centre-back despite only measuring five foot, five inches tall. His brother Hugh McCreadie played for Rangers alongside him.

During his career, McCreadie won the Scottish league championship, the English league championship and the Scottish Cup.

References

1870 births
Rangers F.C. players
Sunderland A.F.C. players
Scotland international footballers
Scottish footballers
Association football defenders
People from Girvan
Year of death missing
Scottish Football League players
Scottish Football League representative players
English Football League players
Place of death missing
Footballers from South Ayrshire